In cardiovascular physiology, stroke volume (SV) is the volume of blood pumped from the left ventricle per beat.  Stroke volume is calculated using measurements of ventricle volumes from an echocardiogram and  subtracting the volume of the blood in the ventricle at the end of a beat (called end-systolic volume) from the volume of blood just prior to the beat (called end-diastolic volume). The term stroke volume can apply to each of the two ventricles of the heart, although it usually refers to the left ventricle. The  stroke volumes for each ventricle are generally equal, both being approximately 70 mL in a healthy 70-kg man.

Stroke volume is an important determinant of cardiac output, which is the product of stroke volume and heart rate, and is also used to calculate ejection fraction, which is stroke volume divided by end-diastolic volume. Because stroke volume decreases in certain conditions and disease states, stroke volume itself correlates with cardiac function.

Calculation

Its value is obtained by subtracting end-systolic volume (ESV) from end-diastolic volume (EDV) for a given ventricle.

In a healthy 70-kg man, ESV is approximately 50 mL and EDV is approximately 120mL, giving a difference of 70 mL for the stroke volume.

Stroke work refers to the work, or pressure of the blood ("P") multiplied by the stroke volume.
ESV and EDV are fixed variables. Heart rate and Stroke volume are unfixed.

Determinants

Men, on average, have higher stroke volumes than women due to the larger size of their hearts. However, stroke volume depends on several factors such as heart size, contractility, duration of contraction, preload (end-diastolic volume), and afterload. Corresponding to the oxygen uptake, women's need for blood flow does not decrease and a higher cardiac frequency makes up for their smaller stroke volume.

Exercise
Prolonged aerobic exercise training may also increase stroke volume, which frequently results in a lower (resting) heart rate. Reduced heart rate prolongs ventricular diastole (filling), increasing end-diastolic volume, and ultimately allowing more blood to be ejected.

Preload and afterload
Stroke volume is intrinsically controlled by preload (the degree to which the ventricles are stretched prior to contracting). An increase in the volume or speed of venous return will increase preload and, through the Frank–Starling law of the heart, will increase stroke volume. Decreased venous return has the opposite effect, causing a reduction in stroke volume.

Elevated afterload (commonly measured as the aortic pressure during systole) reduces stroke volume. It usually does not affect stroke volume in healthy individuals, but increased afterload will hinder the ventricles in ejecting blood, causing reduced stroke volume. Increased afterload may be found in aortic stenosis and arterial hypertension.

Stroke volume index
Similar to cardiac index, stroke volume index is a method of relating the stroke volume (SV) to the size of the person  body surface area  (BSA).

Note

References

Further reading

External links
 The Gross Physiology of the Cardiovascular System
 The Determinants of Cardiac Output (online video)

Cardiovascular physiology